William Henry Ford (April 5, 1880 – September 1, 1962) was an American Negro league outfielder in the 1910s.

A native of Urbana, Ohio, Ford made his Negro leagues debut in 1911 with the Chicago Giants in 1911. He went on to play for the Leland Giants in 1915. Ford died in Cleveland, Ohio in 1962 at age 82.

References

External links
 Baseball-Reference Black Baseball Stats and Seamheads

1880 births
1962 deaths
Chicago Giants players
Leland Giants players
Baseball outfielders
Baseball players from Ohio
People from Urbana, Ohio
20th-century African-American people